Ivy Moore Griffin (November 16, 1896 – August 25, 1957) was a first baseman in  Major League Baseball. He played from 1919 to 1921 for the Philadelphia Athletics.

Griffin was a manager in the minor leagues from 1935 to 1955, winning four league championships. While Griffin managed a Class D team in Eau Claire, Wisconsin, he signed future all-star player Andy Pafko. Pafko, who had never played baseball in high school, was signed while working on his father's nearby farm. Griffin died in an automobile accident in Gainesville, Georgia.

References

External links

1896 births
1957 deaths
Major League Baseball first basemen
Philadelphia Athletics players
Cleveland Indians scouts
Baseball players from Alabama
People from Thomasville, Alabama
Minor league baseball managers
Road incident deaths in Georgia (U.S. state)
Atlanta Crackers players
Milwaukee Brewers (minor league) players
Louisville Colonels (minor league) players
Little Rock Travelers players
Williamsport Grays players
Columbia Sandlappers players
Asheville Tourists players
Jeanerette Blues players
Cordele Reds players
Selma Cloverleafs players
Eau Claire Bears players
Winnipeg Maroons (baseball) players